Marshalling may refer to:

Activity
 Marshalling (computer science)
 Marshalling (heraldry)
 Marshalling, the activity conducted in a railway marshalling yard
 Aircraft marshalling
 Motorsport marshaling
 Marshalling, the switchgear in which the signals from the field instrumentation are collected before the connection to the DCS (grouping of I/O).

Law
 Doctrine of Marshalling - an equitable concept in the law

See also
 Marshal (disambiguation)
 Marshall (disambiguation)